The 1915 Kentucky Derby was the 41st running of the Kentucky Derby. The race took place on May 8, 1915. The winning horse, Regret, generated significant publicity for the race being the first filly to ever win the Derby. Churchill Downs president Matt Winn observed that because of Regret's win "the Derby was thus made an American institution."

Full results

Winning Breeder: Harry Payne Whitney; (NJ)
Horses Kilkenny Boy, Phosphor, and Commonada scratched before the race.

Payout

 The winner received a purse of $11,450.
 Second place received $2,000.
 Third place received $1,000.
 Fourth place received $225.

References

1915
Kentucky Derby
Derby
May 1915 sports events